Snovsk is a city in Koriukivka Raion, Chernihiv Oblast (province) of Ukraine. Population:  It hosts the administration of Snovsk urban hromada, one of the hromadas of Ukraine. The population was 12,315 in 2001.

Name
Historically, The city was named after the Snov River on which it is situated. The city was called Shchors between 1935 and 2016, in honour of Nikolay Shchors. On 21 May 2016, Verkhovna Rada adopted decision to changing the name of Shchors back to its original name Snovsk and consequently renaming Shchors Raion to Snovsk Raion, in accordance with the law prohibiting names of Communist origin.

History
On the eve of WWII, about 16% of the population was Jewish (1,402 Jews). The Germans occupied the city on September 3, 1941. They
kept the Jews prisoners in a ghetto and subjected them to perform different kinds of forced labor. In 1941 and 1942, hundreds of them were murdered in mass executions perpetrated by an Einsatzgruppen in the nearby forest.

Until 18 July 2020, Snovsk was the administrative center of Snovsk Raion (before 2016, Shchors Raion). The raion was abolished in July 2020 as part of the administrative reform of Ukraine, which reduced the number of raions of Chernihiv Oblast to five. The area of Snovsk Raion was merged into Koriukivka Raion.

There was reported fighting in the city during the Russian invasion of Ukraine.

References

External links
 The murder of the Jews of Shchors during World War II, at Yad Vashem website.

Cities in Chernihiv Oblast
Cities of district significance in Ukraine
Gorodnyansky Uyezd
City name changes in Ukraine
Former Soviet toponymy in Ukraine
Holocaust locations in Ukraine